The yellow-crowned tyrannulet (Tyrannulus elatus) is a species of bird in the family Tyrannidae. It is monotypic within the genus Tyrannulus. It is found in Bolivia, Brazil, Colombia, Costa Rica, Ecuador, French Guiana, Guyana, Panama, Peru, Suriname, and Venezuela, where its natural habitats are subtropical or tropical moist lowland forest, subtropical or tropical swamps, and heavily degraded former forest.

References

yellow-crowned tyrannulet
Birds of Panama
Birds of Colombia
Birds of Venezuela
Birds of Ecuador
Birds of the Guianas
Birds of the Amazon Basin
yellow-crowned tyrannulet
Birds of Brazil
Taxonomy articles created by Polbot